The lesser large-headed shrew (Paracrocidura schoutedeni) is a species of shrew in the family Soricidae. It is found in Cameroon, Central African Republic, Republic of the Congo, Democratic Republic of the Congo, Equatorial Guinea, and Gabon. Its natural habitat is subtropical or tropical moist lowland forests.

References
 Hutterer, R. 2004.  Paracrocidura schoutedeni.   2006 IUCN Red List of Threatened Species.   Downloaded on 30 July 2007.

Paracrocidura
Taxonomy articles created by Polbot
Mammals described in 1956
Taxa named by Henri Heim de Balsac